The 2013 Conference USA football season is an NCAA football season that was played from August 2013 through January 2014. The 2013 football season marked the 19th season of the conference's existence and 18th of football competition; although C-USA was established in 1995, it did not begin football competition until 1996.

Previous season

Tulsa won the conference championship for the second time, defeating former members  Central Florida Knights 33–27.

2013 season
Conference USA added several new members this season after losing four.

In preseason polls, Tulsa was projected to be top of the 2013 season followed by East Carolina.

East Division
Projected as the winner of the East Division, East Carolina lost its first conference game of the season to Tulane in triple overtime, 36-33. Marshall then topped the standings until they lost 51-49 to new member Middle Tennessee, which returned East Carolina to the top spot. Until the East Carolina–Marshall game at the end of the season, East Carolina was number one followed by Marshall. Whoever ended up winning the game would then be crowned winners of the East Division. Marshall defeated East Carolina 59–28 to earn the division title.

West Division
As Tulsa was projected to be number one in conference, the team lost their first conference play against Rice in overtime bringing Tulane on top of the western division standings. Tulane became up-top with a conference record of 4–0 after close wins against North Texas, East Carolina, and Tulsa. Tulane then lost their first conference game of the season to Florida Atlantic in early November bringing new member North Texas to the top of the division after North Texas defeated Rice. Projected in being last in the division, UTSA defeated Tulane and North Texas in November, which brought UTSA second in the standings after Rice being brought up to first. At the end of the season, Rice had to defeat Tulane in order to be crown the winners of the west division or Tulane or UTSA would have then been crowned winners of the division. Rice defeated Tulane 17–13 and crowned winners of the West Division for the first time and their first appearance in the championship game as well.

Championship Game
After the 2013 season, the ninth C-USA championship game was played in Houston, Texas, for the third time since 2011, when former member Houston Cougars hosted the Southern Miss Golden Eagles at Robertson Stadium. It was the first time that Rice Stadium would host the Championship game series after Rice won the West Division. Both Rice and Marshall enter the game with 7-1 conference records. Rice was crowned Conference USA Champion for the first time ever after defeating Marshall by 17–points. Rice represented the conference in the 2013 Liberty Bowl in Memphis, Tennessee against  the Mississippi State Bulldogs, a 44-7 loss for Rice.

Bowl season
Eight teams earned bowl eligibility during the season, but UTSA is still transiting into the FBS level and will not be eligible for bowl games until after the 2014 season.

(C-USA teams in italic and winning teams in bold)

Other bowl eligible teams
Florida Atlantic (6-6) became bowl eligible on November 29 after defeating FIU but did not get a bid to a bowl game.

Membership

Houston, Memphis, SMU and UCF left Conference USA, and joined the American Athletic Conference, the football-sponsoring offshoot of the original Big East, on July 1, 2013.

Louisiana Tech and UTSA joined C-USA from the WAC. Florida Atlantic, FIU, Middle Tennessee, and North Texas joined C-USA from the Sun Belt. Old Dominion, which had moved five of its sports from its former home of the Colonial Athletic Association to C-USA for the 2012–13 school year, moved the rest of its athletic program to C-USA. ODU had an established FCS program that played as an FCS independent in 2013, joined C-USA football as a provisional FBS member in 2014, and became fully bowl-eligible in 2015. Charlotte, which was starting a football team this season, was initially an FCS independent before becoming a provisional FBS member in 2014 and a C-USA football member in 2015. The 49ers joined from the Atlantic 10 Conference.

After the 2013 football season East Carolina, Tulane, and Tulsa moved to The American on July 1, 2014, at the start of the 2014 football season. On the same day, Western Kentucky joined C-USA from the Sun Belt.

Rankings

References